Kay Gregory is a journalist and former presenter at Television New Zealand (TVNZ). She previously hosted the Breakfast show with Paul Henry.

Career
Gregory began her television career in 1994, when she became a newsreader and current affairs host for the regional channel, Coast to Coast, in her home city of Hamilton. She started at TVNZ in 1996, and was a reporter for the Breakfast programme when it first went to air in 1997. She then became a reporter for ONE News, and her stint there included some overseas work in the Solomon Islands and Fiji. From 2002 to 2004, Gregory was a full-time weather presenter for TV One. Then on 17 January 2005, she replaced Alison Mau as the co-host of Breakfast.

After leaving Breakfast (on 3 August 2007), Gregory moved into local body politics and was elected as a councillor for Hamilton West. Gregory was the highest-polling councillor, with 11,808 votes. She did not stand again in the 2010 election.

In addition to her work at TVNZ, Gregory is a marriage and funeral celebrant, and a member of International Training and Communication.

See also
 List of New Zealand television personalities

References

Biography of Kay Gregory on the TVNZ website
Confirms intention to stand for city councilor

New Zealand television presenters
New Zealand women television presenters
Year of birth missing (living people)
Living people
Newstalk ZB